"Carnival in Rio (Punk Was)" is a song by Die Toten Hosen and Ronnie Biggs. It's the lead single and the fifteenth track from the cover album Learning English, Lesson One, being also the only non-cover on the album.

The song starts with a spoken intro of a child asking his dad what was punk rock. Ronnie then starts "telling" (singing) him about the punk attitude, which is most importantly about "not giving a fuck".

Since Biggs was hiding from the British authorities in Rio de Janeiro at the time, the vocals were recorded there.

The b-sides to the single were also recorded with Biggs.

Music video
The video was directed by Markus Herold. Also the video was made in Rio de Janeiro. It features the band and Biggs singing the song and having fun around the city, also clips of recording the song.

Track listing
 "Carnival in Rio (Punk Was)" (Frege, von Holst/Biggs) − 3:08
 "No One Is Innocent" (Steve Jones/Biggs) – 3:03 (Sex Pistols & Ronnie Biggs cover)
 "Police on My Back" (Eddy Grant) - 2:16 (The Equals cover)

Charts

1991 singles
Die Toten Hosen songs
Songs written by Campino (singer)
Songs written by Andreas von Holst
1991 songs
Virgin Records singles